William McKie (27 December 1884 – 27 March 1956) was a British wrestler who competed in the 1908 Summer Olympics. In 1908, at the 1908 Summer Olympics, he won the bronze medal in the freestyle wrestling featherweight class.

References

External links
 

Olympic wrestlers of Great Britain
Wrestlers at the 1908 Summer Olympics
British male sport wrestlers
Olympic bronze medallists for Great Britain
1884 births
1956 deaths
Olympic medalists in wrestling
Medalists at the 1908 Summer Olympics